The long-tailed mole (Scaptonyx fusicauda) is a species of mole in the family Talpidae. It is found in China, Vietnam and Myanmar.

Taxonomy
The species is the only species in the genus Scaptonyx and the tribe Scaptonychini. At least two subspecies are recognized in China: S. f. affinis occurs in Yunnan and Guizhou, S. f. fusicauda in Sichuan, Shaanxi, and Guizhou.

Ecology
This mole is fully fossorial and spends its life underground. It has been found at relatively high elevations of 2,000-4,100 m and appears to prefer damp, coniferous montane forests.

References

Talpidae
Mammals of Myanmar
Mammals of China
Mammals of Vietnam
Mammals described in 1872
Taxonomy articles created by Polbot
Taxobox binomials not recognized by IUCN